Vol. 1 is the first studio album by Radio Company. It was released on November 8, 2019, by Two Chair Entertainment. The album was previously titled Cannonball. The album artwork was created by Tom Jean Webb.

The album peaked at number 151 on the Billboard 200, number 18 on the Billboard Top Rock Albums chart, and at number one on the Top Heatseekers chart where it stayed for two weeks. The band debuted at number five on the US Emerging Artists chart.

The album was released on vinyl and peaked at number 11 on the US Top Vinyl Albums chart. On May 7, 2021, the album was released on CD alongside Vol. 2 in a double CD release.

Singles 
"Sounds of Someday" was released on October 18, 2019. The song was used in an episode of the final season of  Supernatural that Jensen Ackles directed and starred in.

Track listing 
All tracks were written by Carlson and Ackles. All tracks were produced by Carlson.

Personnel 

Jensen Ackles – vocals , backing vocals , writer 
Steve Carlson – vocals , backing vocals, writer , producer , guitar, electric guitar, lap steel, synth
Chris Masterson – guitar
Sheree Smith – backing vocals 
Angela Miller – backing vocals 
Bukka Allen – piano, organ, keyboards
Brendon Bond – trumpet
Warren Hood – violin
Topaz McGarrigle – saxophone
Chris Richards – trombone
Kyle Schneider – drums
John Michael Schoepf – bass guitar
Brian Standefer – cello 
Jacob Sciba – mixing
Joseph Holguin – engineer
Howie Weinberg – mastering engineer

Charts

References 

2019 albums
Radio Company albums